Isoparce is a genus of moths in the family Sphingidae. The genus was erected by Walter Rothschild and Karl Jordan in 1903.

Species
Isoparce cupressi (Boisduval, [1875])
Isoparce broui Eitschberger, 2001

References

Sphingini
Moth genera
Taxa named by Walter Rothschild
Taxa named by Karl Jordan